Unpeeled is a 1995 compilation of sessions recorded by The Bonzo Dog Band for the John Peel show on the BBC during the late sixties.

Track listing
"Do the Trouser Press" (Roger Ruskin Spear) – 02:19
"Canyons of Your Mind" (Vivian Stanshall) – 03:09
"I'm the Urban Spaceman" (Neil Innes) – 02:38
"Hello Mabel" (Innes) – 02:41
"Mr Apollo" (Stanshall, Innes) – 04:17
"Tent" (Stanshall) – 02:37
"Monster Mash" (Bobby (Boris) Pickett, Leonard Capizzi) – 03:13
"Give Booze a Chance" (John Lennon) (cover of "Give Peace a Chance")  01:18
"We Were Wrong" (Stanshall) – 02:21
"Keynsham" (Innes) – 01:45
"I Want to Be With You" (Innes) – 02:04
"Mickey's Son and Daughter" (Edward Lisbona, Tommy Connor) – 02:39
"The Craig Torso Show" – 05:14
"Can Blue Men Sing the Whites?" (Stanshall) – 02:39
"Look at Me I'm Wonderful" (Stanshall) – 02:52
"Quiet Talk and Summer Walks" (Innes) – 03:40

Personnel
Vivian Stanshall, "Legs" Larry Smith, David Clague, Dennis Cowan, Neil Innes, Rodney Slater, Roger Ruskin Spear, Sam Spoons, Vernon Dudley Bohay-Nowell 
Liner Notes: John Peel

References

Bonzo Dog Doo-Dah Band compilation albums
1995 compilation albums
Peel Sessions recordings
Strange Fruit Records compilation albums